Gedeon Richter Plc. is a European multinational pharmaceutical and biotechnology company headquartered in Budapest. It is the largest pharmaceutical company in Central and Eastern Europe, with an expanding direct presence in Western Europe, China, Northern America and Latin America. Richter has the largest R&D unit in Central and Eastern Europe and operations in over 50 countries.

Gedeon Richter Plc. has a primary listing on the Budapest Stock Exchange and is a constituent of the BUX Index. It had a market capitalisation of approximately $6.6 billion as of 2018, the third largest of companies with a primary listing on the Budapest Stock Exchange. It has secondary listings on the Luxembourg Stock Exchange.

The company sells products for the central nervous system, women’s health and cardiovascular therapeutic areas among others. Richter is also active in biosimilar product development. The company was established in Budapest by Gedeon Richter (1872–1944), a pharmacist, in 1901.

History

Early history 
In 1901, the pharmacist Gedeon Richter founded the company, when he first received a license to industrially produce medicines.

Initially, small-scale pharmaceutical production took place in the Arany Sas (Golden Eagle) Pharmacy, which still operates today. At the time pharmaceutical production on an industrial scale required heavy investments, and large-scale pharmaceutical manufacturing activities were considered to be extremely capital-intensive operations. Initially, the laboratory processed extracts from organs of animals and produced organotherapeutic drugs.

The plant was built in 1907 in the Kőbánya suburb of Budapest and was Hungary´s first pharmaceutical manufacturing plant and regarded as an outstanding technological achievement in its day. In compliance with the established international trends of the pharmaceutical industry in those days, the company produced herbal drugs, processed extracts from plants and manufactured synthetic products at a later date. The company became a highly recognized manufacturer of lecithin products, antiseptic and febrifuge products, as well as painkillers (Hyperol, Kalmopyrin, and Tonogen, which continue to be in use). In 1934, Constant Janssen, of the future Janssen Pharmaceuticals, acquired the distribution rights for Gedeon Richter's products.

In the 1970s, chemists at the Gedeon Richter Chemical Works in Budapest discovered the brain enhancing drug Vinpocetine.

In 1995 Gedeon Richter signed a manufacturing contract with Danco for marketing an abortion pill in France. In 1997 the company made the decision to breach of contract by pulling out the production on U.S. market. Thus, on May 9, 1997 the New Yorker Supreme Court  accused the company by Danco Laboratories Ltd., because they lost over $200 million by the abortion pill project.

Recent history 
In May 2006 Gedeon Richter signed a development and supply agreement with the US-based company Repros Therapeutics to produce Proellex. In July 2007 Gedeon Richter signed a contract with Barr Pharma for the production of Novartis Lamisil. Barr paid Gedeon Richter a royalty for distributing the product in the U.S.

From July 2008 - April 2012, the company constructed a new manufacturing facility ($110 million) in Debrecen.

In October 2010, Gedeon Richter acquired 100% of a private Swiss biopharmaceutical company, PregLem, for CHF 445 million (€337 million). PregLem is focused on the treatment of gynecological conditions and infertility.

In 2015, Stada Arzneimittel AG and Gedeon Richter signed a license and distribution agreement to commercialize Richter’s biosimilar Pegfilgrastim in Europe. According to the agreement Stada receives non-exclusive distribution rights for the area of geographical Europe (excluding Russia), while Richter retains its rights to distribute and market biosimilar Pegfilgrastim worldwide.

In January 2017, William de Gelsey resigned as Chairman of the board of Gedeon Richter. He was replaced by former CEO Erik Bogsch, who served as a Chief Executive Officer of Gedeon Richter from 1992 to November 2017. As the new Chief Executive Officer he appointed Gabor Orban, a former fund manager, government official and Bogsch’s deputy since 2016. De Gelsey remains to be a member of the board.

In April 2017, Evestra signed a collaboration partnership agreement with Gedeon Richter. In February 2019, Gedeon Richter and Pantarhei Bioscience signed a license and supply agreement for the commercialization of a novel combined oral contraceptive.

In September 2018 the company started collaborating with the company  to distribut its contraceptive, Estelle, in Europe and Russia.

Richter's atypical antipsychotic, Reagila, containing the active ingredient cariprazine, was awarded the prize of Medicine of the Year 2019 by the Hungarian Society for Experimental and Clinical Pharmacology (MFT).

Corporate affairs

Organizational structure 
Gedeon Richter has various subsidiaries in different countries: Gedeon Richter Polska, Gedeon Richter Romania and Gedeon Richter RUS are regional production subsidiaries. Richter-Themis Medicare (India) (51% Gedeon Richter, 49% Themis), Richter-Helm BioLogics and BioTec (Germany), Mediplus N.V. (Curaçao), Gedeon Richter Mexico, S.A.P.I. de C.V., Gedeon Richter Do Brasil Importadora, Exportadora E Distribuidora S.A. and Gedeon Richter Columbia S.A.S. are international subsidiaries in production and distribution.

Leadership structure 
The company's chief governing body is the Board of Directors. The board's Chairman is Erik Bogsch, who had served as Chief Executive Officer since 1992 and was succeeded by Gábor Orbán as CEO in November 2017. The board members are Gábor Gulácsi, János Csák, Dr. Ilona Hardy, Dr. György Bagdy, Csaba Lantos, Anett Pandurics, Bálint Szécsényi, Prof Dr Szilveszter E. Vizi, Dr.Kriszta Zolnay.

The company's other governing bodies are the Executive Board and the Supervisory Board.
The executive board is led by Erik Bogsch. Other members are Gábor Orbán, Gábor Gulácsi, István Greiner, Tibor Horváth, György Thaler. 

The supervisory board is led by Róbert Jonathán Bedros. Other members are Attila Chikán, Klára Csikós Kovácsné, Zsolt Harmath, and Éva Kozsda Kovácsné.

Shareholder structure 
As of December 31, 2018, Gedeon Richter’s shareholder structure is:

 66% - International investors
 25% - Hungarian State (Hungarian State Holding Company, MNV Zrt.)
 9% - Domestic investors

In 2018 the dividends approved by the shareholders of Gedeon Richter were EUR 41 million in total.

Operations 
The corporation has two plants today: the headquarters in Budapest, and a subsidiary in Dorog which has been operating since 1967.
The company has joint ventures in India with Themis Medicare, and in Germany, with Helm AG.2012. Biotechnology plant in Debrecen.

Awards 
In 2017, Gedeon Richter was recognized by the Hungarian Innovation Foundation with the Innovation Grand Prize for the development of Cariprazine, an antipsychotic drug which is used in the treatment of schizophrenia and bipolar disorders.

IUPAC-Richter Prize 
In 2006, Gedeon Richter gifted a large sum to the International Union of Pure and Applied Chemistry (IUPAC), thereby establishing the IUPAC–Richter Prize in Medicinal Chemistry. The $10,000 prize is awarded every second year to an internationally recognized scientist (normally a medicinal chemist), whose research or publications have made a significant contribution to the practice of medicinal chemistry. The prize was initiated to honor and highlight the central role of medicinal chemistry in improving human health.

See also 
 Economy of Budapest
 Economy of Hungary
 Science and technology in Hungary

References

External links 

 
 Company headquarters' location in Budapest, Hungary: 

Pharmaceutical companies established in 1901
Pharmaceutical companies of Hungary
Biotechnology companies of Hungary
Vaccine producers
Veterinary medicine companies
Hungarian brands
Manufacturing companies based in Budapest
Orphan drug companies
Kőbánya
Companies of Austria-Hungary
1901 establishments in Hungary